Khauz is a village in Aravan District of Osh Region of Kyrgyzstan. Its population was 1,964 in 2021.

References

Populated places in Osh Region